Yuri Vera Cruz Erbas (born 30 April 1986), commonly known as Yuri, is a retired Brazilian footballer.

Honours
 Flamengo
Copa Record Rio de Futebol: 2005

Career statistics

Club

Notes

References

1986 births
Living people
Brazilian footballers
Association football forwards
CR Flamengo footballers
Bonsucesso Futebol Clube players
Clube Esportivo Bento Gonçalves players
Sportspeople from Belém